Frank Hart (1856 – 1908) was an American athlete famous as the first African-American world record holder in the 19th century sport of pedestrianism. His most noted win was in an 1879 6 Day Race at Madison Square Garden where he covered 565 miles and won $21,567 in prize money. Later in life Hart played briefly on segregated baseball teams. Though his legacy faded with the loss of interest in pedestrianism as a spectator sport, Hart remains one of the first nationally famous Black athletes in America.

Early life and rise to fame as a pedestrian 
Born in 1856 as Fred Hichborn, Hart immigrated to Boston from Haiti as a teenager and worked as a grocery store clerk before joining races to earn extra money.  Frank Hart was chosen as his stage name, and he was variously also known as "The Negro Wonder" and "Black Dan", after his mentor and promoter Dan O'Leary. Hart competed in at least 63 six-day pedestrian races from 1879-1902, winning 16 of them. Hart was ultimately one of the first black sports celebrities in America. 

The first black athlete depicted on a sports card, trading card or tobacco card, Hart appears in Thomas H. Hall’s Between the Acts & Bravo Cigarettes set (1880, N344), along with nine other pedestrians and two oarsmen.

Baseball career and later life 
Hart later played shortstop and second base on Black baseball teams. In 1883, he was a member of the Boston Vendome Hotel B.B.C. team, and in 1883-1884, Hart played for Saratoga Spring's Leonidas B.B.C. According to The Negro Leagues Were Major Leagues: Historians Reappraise Black Baseball, "Henry Bridgewater recruited Hart for the St. Louis Black Stockings." While no statistics are currently available for his tenure on the team, in May 1884, The Washington Bee reported that the “colored pedestrian plays shortstop for a colored baseball club known as the St. Louis Black Stockings.” Hart eventually signed with Chicago's Illinois Gordon B.B.C.

In Hart’s obituary in 1908, the Cleveland Gazette noted, “Like many other sporting men, he was a big liver and a good spender,’’ reportedly living off “the charity of friends” for his final years.

See also
 List of African-American firsts

References 

1850s births
1908 deaths

Year of birth uncertain
19th-century African-American people